Ronald den Arend (born 14 May 1972 in Rotterdam) is a sailor from the Netherlands, who represented his country at the 2008 Vintage Yachting Games in Medemblik, The Netherlands. Den Arend on the foredeck, together with helmsman Rudy den Outer and Leo Determan in the middle, took the Gold medal in the Soling. 
Ronald holds several Dutch titles in the Soling. He is a member of the Kralingsche Zeil Club in Rotterdam.

Personal life 
Den Arend and his family live in the Rotterdam area, where he works as chief information officer and chief information security officer for the SWKGroep in Berkel en Rodenrijs.

References

1972 births
Living people
Dutch male sailors (sport)
Optimist class sailors
Laser class sailors
Soling class sailors
Sportspeople from Rotterdam
20th-century Dutch people
21st-century Dutch people